The South African Railways Class G 4-8-2T of 1904 was a steam locomotive from the pre-Union era in the Colony of Natal.

In 1904, the Natal Government Railways placed 25 Class E  tank steam locomotives in service. In 1912, when these locomotives were assimilated into the South African Railways, they were renumbered and designated .

Manufacturer
The first locomotive to be designed for the Natal Government Railways (NGR) by D.A. Hendrie, who had succeeded G.W. Reid as Locomotive Superintendent of the NGR on 8 January 1903, was a  tank locomotive. It was built by the newly established North British Locomotive Company (NBL) in the former Dübs shops in Glasgow, Scotland.

Twenty-five of these locomotives were delivered in 1904, numbered in the range from 250 to 274. Until they were designated Class E at some stage between 1904 and 1908, they were known on the NGR as the Dübs B or Improved Dübs, even though Dübs and Company had already ceased to exist when the locomotives were built, having been merged into the NBL.

Characteristics

The locomotive was intended for use on mainline work and Hendrie used the Reid Tenwheeler (NGR Class C) and the Dübs A (NGR Class D) as basis for its design. The result was an engine which looked like a smaller version of the Reid Tenwheeler locomotive. With a larger boiler and working at a higher boiler pressure, the Class E was a more powerful locomotive than the NGR Class D, but Hendrie had made no radical changes in the basic design to the work of his predecessors.

The engine had inclined cylinders, arranged outside the plate frames. Its balanced slide valves were arranged above the cylinders and were actuated by Stephenson link motion through rocker shafts. The locomotives were the first in South Africa to have "H" section coupling rods and connecting rods.

South African Railways

When the Union of South Africa was established on 31 May 1910, the three Colonial government railways (Cape Government Railways, NGR and Central South African Railways) were united under a single administration to control and administer the railways, ports and harbours of the Union. Although the South African Railways and Harbours came into existence in 1910, the actual classification and renumbering of all the rolling stock of the three constituent railways were only implemented with effect from 1 January 1912.

In 1912, these locomotives were designated Class G on the South African Railways (SAR) and renumbered in the range from 197 to 221.

Service
The locomotives entered service working the mainline passenger Corridor Trains out of Durban, but they were soon replaced by the NGR Class B  tender locomotives, Hendrie's second locomotive design, which entered service later in 1904. They were then used as banking engines from Ladysmith up the Van Reenen Pass on the rail connection between Natal and Harrismith in the Orange River Colony. They remained in use there as well as in general service on some of the heavier branch lines until the loads became too heavy for them.

By 1944, six of them were still working in light shunting at various marshalling yards in the Union. The last pair were withdrawn from shunting service around Pietermaritzburg in 1962. Several were sold to mines and other industrial concerns.

Preservation
The last of the Class to be built, ex NGR no. 274, SAR no. 221, was moved from Millsite in Krugersdorp to the Outeniqua Transport Museum in George during August 2014. another G class NLC 2 survives at Witbank Loco Depot.

References

1120
1120
4-8-2 locomotives
2D1 locomotives
4-8-2T locomotives
NBL locomotives
Cape gauge railway locomotives
Railway locomotives introduced in 1904
1904 in South Africa